John Goldham aka Goldhawk (dates unknown) was an English professional cricketer who made 35 known appearances in first-class cricket matches from 1791 to 1812.

Career
He was mainly associated with Middlesex.

References

External sources
 CricketArchive record

English cricketers
English cricketers of 1787 to 1825
Middlesex cricketers
Year of birth unknown
Year of death unknown
Marylebone Cricket Club cricketers
Surrey cricketers
London Cricket Club cricketers
Non-international England cricketers
R. Leigh's XI cricketers
Old Westminsters cricketers
Middlesex and Marylebone Cricket Club cricketers